Those Years is a 1973 Mexican drama film directed by Felipe Cazals. It was entered into the 8th Moscow International Film Festival where it won a Special Prize.

Cast
 Jorge Martínez de Hoyos as Benito Juárez
 Helena Rojo as Empress Carlota
 Paco Morayta as Emperor Maximilian
 Julián Pastor as Jesús González Ortega
 Salvador Sánchez as General Melchor Ocampo
 David Silva as General Leonardo Márquez
 Gonzalo Vega as General Ignacio Zaragoza
 Mario Almada as Mariano Escobedo
 Pancho Córdova as Jecker
 Roberto Dumont as Napoleón III
 Enrique Lucero as Juan Nepomuceno Almonte

References

External links
 

1973 films
1973 drama films
Films directed by Felipe Cazals
Mexican drama films
1970s Spanish-language films
1970s Mexican films